July 29 - Eastern Orthodox Church calendar - July 31

All fixed commemorations below are celebrated on August 12 by Old Calendar.

For July 30th, Orthodox Churches on the Old Calendar commemorate the Saints listed on July 17.

Saints
 Apostles of the Seventy Silas and Silvanus, and with them Apostles Crescens, Epenetus, and Andronicus (1st century)
 Martyrs under Decius (c. 251):
 Hieromartyr Polychronius, Bishop of Babylon in Egypt;
 Hieromartyrs Parmenius, Helimenas (Elimas), and Chrysotelus, Priests;
 Luke and Mocius, Deacons;
 Martyrs Maximus and Olympius.
 Martyrs Abdon and Sennen, princes of Persia, at Rome (251)
 Hieromartyr Valentine, Bishop of Interamna (Terni) in Italy, and his martyred disciples Proculus, Ephebus, Apollonius, and Abundius (c. 273) (see also: February 14, July 6)
 Martyr John the Soldier, at Tralles in Asia Minor (361-363)  (see also: July 29)
 Martyr Julitta of Caesarea in Cappadocia (4th century)

Pre-Schism Western saints
 Saint Rufinus of Assisi, a martyr in one of the early persecutions in Assisi in Italy.
 Saints Maxima, Donatilla and Secunda, three holy virgins (Secunda was aged twelve), martyred in Tebourba in North Africa under Diocletian (304)
 Saint Peter Chrysologus, Archbishop of Ravenna (c. 450)
 Saint Ursus of Auxerre, a hermit at the church of St Amator in Auxerre in France, who was made bishop of that city when he was aged seventy-five (508)
 Saint Ermengyth, a sister of St Ermenburgh, she lived as a nun at Minster-in-Thanet in England (c. 680)
 Saint Tatwine, the tenth Archbishop of Canterbury (734)
 Martyr-King Olaf II Haraldsson, Enlightener of Norway (1030)

Post-Schism Orthodox saints
 Saint Stephen Vladislav of Serbia (1243) (see also: September 24)
 Prince Tsotne Dadiani the Confessor, of Mingrelia, Georgia (13th century)
 Saint Angelina (Brancovic), Despotina of Serbia (c. 1520)

New martyrs and confessors
 New Hieromartyr John Plotnikov, Deacon (1918)
 New Hiero-confessor Anatole II (Potapov) "the Younger", Elder of Optina Monastery (1922)

Other commemorations
 Uncovering of the relics (1484) of Venerable Herman of Solovki (1479)
 Synaxis of the Saints of Samara.
 Synaxis of the Saints of Aegina.
 Sitka Icon of the Most Holy Theotokos. (see also: July 8)
 Icon of the Mother of God of Okonsk.

Icon gallery

Notes

References

Sources
 July 30/August 12. Orthodox Calendar (pravoslavie.ru).
 August 12 / July 30. Holy Trinity Russian Orthodox Church (a parish of the Patriarchate of Moscow).
 July 30. OCA - The Lives of the Saints.
 July 30. The Year of Our Salvation - Holy Transfiguration Monastery, Brookline, Massachusetts. 
 The Autonomous Orthodox Metropolia of Western Europe and the Americas (ROCOR). St. Hilarion Calendar of Saints for the year of our Lord 2004. St. Hilarion Press (Austin, TX). p. 56.
 The Thirtieth Day of the Month of July. Orthodoxy in China.
 July 30. Latin Saints of the Orthodox Patriarchate of Rome.
 The Roman Martyrology. Transl. by the Archbishop of Baltimore. Last Edition, According to the Copy Printed at Rome in 1914. Revised Edition, with the Imprimatur of His Eminence Cardinal Gibbons. Baltimore: John Murphy Company, 1916. p. 226.
 Rev. Richard Stanton. A Menology of England and Wales, or, Brief Memorials of the Ancient British and English Saints Arranged According to the Calendar, Together with the Martyrs of the 16th and 17th Centuries. London: Burns & Oates, 1892. pp. 368–371.

Greek Sources
 Great Synaxaristes:  30 ΙΟΥΛΙΟΥ. ΜΕΓΑΣ ΣΥΝΑΞΑΡΙΣΤΗΣ.
  Συναξαριστής. 30 Ιουλίου. ecclesia.gr. (H ΕΚΚΛΗΣΙΑ ΤΗΣ ΕΛΛΑΔΟΣ). 
  30/07/. Ορθόδοξος Συναξαριστής.

Russian Sources
  12 августа (30 июля). Православная Энциклопедия под редакцией Патриарха Московского и всея Руси Кирилла (электронная версия). (Orthodox Encyclopedia - Pravenc.ru).
  30 июля по старому стилю / 12 августа по новому стилю. СПЖ "Союз православных журналистов". .

July in the Eastern Orthodox calendar